Baat Hai Pyaar Ki is a 1991 Bollywood film starring Archana Joglekar and Sadashiv Amrapurkar.It also includes the Starcast like Sulabha Deshpande, Shreeram Lagoo.  It has gained a review of 2 out of 5 stars.

Soundtrack

References

External links

1991 films
1990s Hindi-language films
Films scored by Vijay Batalvi